Parliamentary elections were held in Latvia on 5 October 2002. The New Era Party emerged as the largest party in the Saeima, winning 26 of the 100 seats.

Results

Aftermath
Voters severely punished the previous governing parties, with the People's Party and For Fatherland and Freedom both losing seats, while Latvian Way lost all its MPs.

A new coalition government was formed by the New Era Party, Latvia's First Party, For Fatherland and Freedom and the Union of Greens and Farmers. This enjoyed a parliamentary majority of 55 of the 100 MPs. However, after two years For Fatherland and Freedom left the coalition and was replaced by the People's Party, who returned to government after a two-year absence.

References

Parliamentary elections in Latvia
Latvia
Parliamentary